Janée Bennett, known professionally as Jin Jin, is an English musician, singer and songwriter from Manchester.

She is known for predominantly writing songs with Jess Glynne, RAYE and Jax Jones.

Career
As a child Bennett became interested in music whilst hanging out in her grandfather’s reggae music record shop and enrolled at City College Manchester to do a National Diploma in Music Technology and a Higher National Diploma.

Bennett signed to the music publisher Windswept Music UK and completed an undergraduate degree in Music Industry Management and Marketing at Buckinghamshire University. To see herself through college she modelled for fashion brands including Agent Provocateur and DKNY.

In September 2008, having moved to London, Bennett co-wrote the Roll Deep single "Do Me Wrong", from their album Return of the Big Money Sound. In October 2009, Bennett released her debut single, "Sex in the City", via Moshi Moshi Records; NME magazine described the track as "rude, fresh and kinda brilliant". A version of the single features rapper Tinchy Stryder. Bennett was profiled in The Guardians "New band of the week" feature the same month, with Paul Lester describing her as "a rougher, cruder version of glossy American R&B" and "a new urban female who is... like a Moss Side Pink if she'd worked with Tinchy instead of Linda Perry".

In October 2013, Bennett issued "Fire Me Up" under her shortened stage name Jin Jin. She collaborated with the band Polar Bear on the song "Cuckoo", released as a single in October 2014.

Bennett is a successful songwriter for others, signed through the UK office to Universal Music Publishing Group worldwide. Bennett discovered the seven times #1 singer Jess Glynne whilst teaching a masterclass at Jess's music college, and went on to collaborate with Glynne on tracks for her debut album. This included Jess Glynne's first official single "Right Here", which was a UK top ten hit in 2014. Bennett co-wrote Glynne's second collaboration with Clean Bandit, "Real Love", as well as "Not Letting Go" featuring Tinie Tempah which topped the UK charts. She also co-wrote Jess Glynne's "Hold My Hand" which was a UK #1 as well as being Jess's first entry on the Billboard Hot 100. The song was also used in an advertisement for Coca-Cola in 2015 and was featured on the original movie soundtrack for the 2016 film, Bridget Jones's Baby. She also co-wrote 10 tracks on Jess’s second album Always In Between. Both of Jess’s albums have topped the charts, and Jin Jin was nominated for an Ivor Novello and won a BMI Award for her writing on ‘Hold My Hand’. Jess’s debut album I Cry When I Laugh is now 4 x Platinum in the UK alone.

In 2018 her co-write with Raye & Jax Jones "You Don't Know Me" was nominated for a BRIT Award, and has now racked up upwards of 400 million streams. She recently picked up a BMI award for "Home With You" by Madison Beer. Other notable recent successes include "Lullaby" by Sigala and Paloma Faith, which was in the top 10 biggest songs of 2018 and went Platinum in the UK, and "Alien" by Jonas Blue and Sabrina Carpenter which reached #1 on the Billboard Dance Chart.

Jin Jin has collaborated with a host of international producers and artists such as Stephen Di Genius, Fraser T. Smith, Toby Gad, Diplo, and David Guetta, and artists Jess Glynne, Jax Jones, RAYE, Paloma Faith & Sigala. Further collaborations include Jonas Blue & Sabrina Carpenter, Madison Beer, Yebba, Sean Paul, Rita Ora, Clean Bandit, Nina Nesbitt, Craig David, Gary Barlow and most recently break-through artists Hailee Steinfeld and Becky G Jin Jin recently co-wrote the 2021 UEFA Champions League x Pepsi anthem ‘Rotate’ by Burna Boy and Becky G.

In 2015 Bennett set up her own publishing company, Raggamuffin Music, in conjunction with Bucks Music Group. A few years later she set up Jinsing, a label and management company with a publishing arm that is a joint venture with Universal Music Publishing. She recently won the Music Creative Award at the UK's Women In Music event. The award was presented to her by long time friend and collaborator Jess Glynne. Jin Jin is now also a Senior A&R manager at Parlophone Records and joined the board of Directors of The Ivors Academy in 2020.

Personal life
Jin Jin is the daughter of former Sunderland footballer Gary Bennett.

Songwriting credits

Artist discography
"Do Me Wrong" (2008) Roll Deep feat. Janée “Jin Jin” Bennett 
"Touch My" (2009) Mos Wanted Mega feat. Janée “Jin Jin” Bennett 
"Sex in the City" (2009)
"Cashpoint Drama" (2012) 
"Love in Sin City" (2012)
"Whistle at Me" (2012) 
"Fire Me Up" (2013)
"Cuckoo" (2014) Polar Bear with Janée “Jin Jin” Bennett 
"Break Loose" (2015) Televisor feat. Janée “Jin Jin” Bennett & Splitbreed

References

External links

Year of birth missing (living people)
Living people
People from Stockport
English electro musicians
English women pop singers
British contemporary R&B singers
English songwriters
Grime music artists
Musicians from Greater Manchester
21st-century English women singers
21st-century English singers